The 2003–04 snooker season was a series of snooker tournaments played between 21 August 2003 and 20 May 2004. The following table outlines the results for ranking events and the invitational events.

LG Corporation signed a sponsorship agreement with World Snooker, and the seven world ranking events before the World Championship were branded as the "LG Electronics Tour". These tournaments carried conventional ranking points but also had a separate points system, with a £50,000 prize for the player who accumulated the most points during the LG Electronics Tour. Ronnie O'Sullivan was the eventual winner of the cash prize, but both the sponsorship and format would only last for one season.



Calendar

Official rankings 

The top 16 of the world rankings, these players automatically played in the final rounds of the world ranking events and were invited for the Masters.

Points distribution 
2003/2004 Points distribution for world ranking events, all new players received double points:

Notes

References

External links

2003
Season 2004
Season 2003